The 2002 TV Guide NZ Television Awards were staged on Saturday 29 June 2002 in Auckland, New Zealand. Honouring excellence in New Zealand television for the previous year, the awards were sponsored by New Zealand TV Guide magazine, the final year of its eight-year period as a naming-rights sponsor of the awards. As there had been no awards in 2001, the 2002 awards also covered the 2001 awards period. The awards ceremony was not broadcast on television.

Nominees and winners

Awards were given in 37 categories, including two people's choice awards – Best New Programme and Best Presenter. 

Best Children's Programme
Coke Smokefree Rockquest, Richard Hansen (Screentime-Communicado)jessie.com, Janine Morrell (Whitebait Productions)
Pukana, Nicole Hoey & Matai Smith (Cinco Cine Film Productions)Best Documentary1951, John Bates (Bates Productions)Big, Philippa Mossman (Greenstone Pictures)
Numero Bruno, Nicola Saker (La Hood Productions)Best Drama ProgrammeFish Skin Suit, Larry Parr & Julian Arahanga (Kahukura Productions)Clare, Dave Gibson (Gibson Group)
Staunch, William Grieve & Keith Hunter (Hunter Productions)Best Drama Series or SerialBeing Eve, Vanessa Alexander (South Pacific Pictures)Mercy Peak, John Laing (South Pacific Pictures) 
Street Legal, Chris Hampson (ScreenWorks)Best Entertainment ProgrammeWhat Now? 20th Anniversary Special, Tony Palmer (TVNZ)2001 Montana Wearable Art Awards, Ron Pledger (TVNZ)
Pacifica Beats 2000, Greg Mayor (TVNZ)Best Entertainment SeriesPolyfest 2001, Claudette Hauiti (Front of the Box Productions)A Game of Two-Halves, Nick Tapper (Touchdown Television)
Mo Show, Mark Williams & Otis Frizzell (XSTV)Best Documentary SeriesCaptain's Log, Gresham Bradley & John A. Givins (Livingstone Productions)The Big Art Trip, Janice Finn (Screentime-Communicado)
Pioneer House, Miranda Grace (Touchdown Television)Best Factual SeriesCountry Calendar, Frank Torley/Country Calendar Production Team (TVNZ)Babies, Bettina Hollings & Bronwen Stewart (Imagination Television)
It's Your Money, Derek Stuart (Touchdown Television)Best Lifestyle SeriesTravel.co.nz, Tash Christie (Screentime-Communicado)Mitre 10 DIY Rescue, Julie Christie (Touchdown Television)
Taste New Zealand, Leonie Mansor & Chris Wright (TVNZ)Best Comedy ProgrammeSpin Doctors, Tony Holden (Comedia Pictures) An Audience with the King, Mike King & Eric Derks (At Least Ya Havin' A Go)
Willy Nilly, Judith Trye & John Gilbert (Big House)
Xena: Warrior Princess "Lyre Lyre Hearts on Fire", Chloe Smith & Robert Tapert (Pacific Renaissance Pictures)Best Sports ProgrammeFight For Life, John McDonald (TV3)Shell Helix Motorsport – V8 Supercars Pukekohe, David Turner & Stephen Coates (TVNZ – One Sports) 
Fisher & Paykel Series Netball NZ vs Australia, Stephen Coates (TVNZ – One Sports) Best Maori ProgrammeWhanau, Tumanako Productions & Greenstone PicturesSomeone Else's Child, Rhonda Kite (Kiwa Productions)
The Truth About Maori, Rhonda Kite (Kiwa Productions)Best Maori Language ProgrammeHe Tohunga Whakairo, Toby Mills for Tawera Productions & Moana Maniapoto for Black Pearl Productions)Ahorangi 2000, Derek Wooster (TVNZ)
Ahorangi Ruamano, Maria Amoamo & Paora Maxwell (Te Aratai Productions)Best ActressMamaengaroa Kerr-Bell, Staunch (Hunter Productions)Robyn Malcolm, Clare (Gibson Group)
Sara Wiseman, Mercy Peak (South Pacific Pictures)Best ActorTamati Te Nohotu, Staunch (Hunter Productions)Jay Laga'aia, Street Legal (ScreenWorks)
Jeffrey Thomas, Mercy Peak (South Pacific Pictures)Best Supporting ActressAlison Bruce, Mercy Peak (South Pacific Pictures)Jan Fisher, Mercy Peak (South Pacific Pictures)
Madeleine Sami, Fish Skin Suit (Kahukura Productions)Best Supporting ActorTim Balme, Mercy Peak (South Pacific Pictures)Stuart Devenie, Jack of All Trades  "Croquey in the Pokey" (Pacific Renaissance Pictures)
John Katipa, Staunch (Hunter Productions)Best Juvenile Actor/ActressRose McIver, Xena: Warrior Princess – Little Problems (Pacific Renaissance Pictures)Rachel Batty, Fish Skin Suit (Kahukura Productions)
Luke Tarei, Fish Skin Suit (Kahukura Productions)Best Entertainment/Comedy PerformanceSean Duffy, Willy Nilly (Big House)Mark Hadlow, Willy Nilly (Big House)
Mike King, An Audience with the King (At Least Ya Havin' A Go)Best Script Drama ProgrammeToa Fraser & Keith Hunter, Staunch (Hunter Productions)Briar Grace Smith, Fish Skin Suit (Kahukura Productions)Best Script, Drama SeriesGavin Strawhan, Mercy Peak (South Pacific Pictures)Maxine Fleming, Being Eve (South Pacific Pictures)
Greg McGee, Street Legal (ScreenWorks)Best Script, ComedyKen Duncum, Mike Smith, Cal Wilson, Paul Yates, Willy Nilly (Big House)James Griffin, Roger Hall, Tom Scott, Spin Doctors (Comedia Pictures)Best Director, DramaKeith Hunter, Staunch (Hunter Productions)Geoff Cawthorn, Mercy Peak (South Pacific Pictures)
Yvonne MacKay, Clare (Gibson Group)Best Director, ComedyMike Smith, Willy Nilly (Big House)Jason Gunn, jessie.com (Whitebait Productions)
Tony Holden, Spin Doctors (Comedia Pictures) Best Director, DocumentaryJohn Bates, 1951 (Bates Productions)Steve La Hood, Numero Bruno (La Hood Productions)
Fiona Samuel, Virginity (Murmur Films)Best Director, Factual/Entertainment ProgrammeBryan Bruce, Wild About New Zealand (Red Sky)Nigel Carpenter, Big Comedy Gala (Phoenix Television)
Mike Ritchie, What Now? 20th Anniversary Special (TVNZ)Best Camera, DramaJames Cowley, Fish Skin Suit (Kahukura Productions)Simon Baumfield, Street Legal (ScreenWorks)
John Cavill, Xena: Warrior Princess "Lyre Lyre Hearts on Fire" (Pacific Renaissance Pictures)Best Camera, Non-DramaPeter Young, Country Calendar (TVNZ)Swami Hansa, Kiwi Buddha (Spacific Films)
Steven Orsbourn, Tuaman – Destiny in My Hands (Oxygen Productions)Best Editing, DramaTim Woodhouse, Staunch (Hunter Productions)Allanah Milne, Mercy Peak (South Pacific Pictures) 
Paul Sutorius, Clare (Gibson Group)Best Editing, Non-DramaPeter Roberts, God, Sreenu and Me (MF Films)Geoff Conway, Numero Bruno (La Hood Productions)
Ollie Tira'a, Polyfest 2001 (Front of the Box Productions)Best Original MusicCarl Doy, Buzz and Poppy (Huhu Enterprises)Joel Haines, Mercy Peak (South Pacific Pictures)
Joost Langeveld & Victoria Kelly, Being Eve (South Pacific Pictures)Best Contribution to a SoundtrackSuite 16, Carl Smith, Being Eve (South Pacific Pictures)Chris Burt, Cleopatra 2525 "Pod Whisperer" (Pacific Renaissance Pictures)
Suite 16, Neil Newcombe, Carl Smith and Travis Hefferen, Mercy Peak (South Pacific Pictures)Best Production DesignRobert Gillies, Jack of All Trades  – Shark Bait (Pacific Renaissance Pictures)Robert Gillies, Xena: Warrior Princess "Devi" (Pacific Renaissance Pictures)
Brett Schwieters, Mercy Peak (South Pacific Pictures)Best Costume DesignJanet Dunn, Clare (Gibson Group)Jane Holland, Cleopatra 2525 "Run Cleo Run" (Pacific Renaissance Pictures)
Jane Holland, Jack of All Trades  "It's A Mad, Mad, Mad, Opera" (Pacific Renaissance Pictures)Best Contribution to DesignZane Holmes, Being Eve (South Pacific Pictures)Larry Justice, Street Legal (ScreenWorks)
George Port, Cleopatra 2525 "Pod Whisperer" (Pacific Renaissance Pictures)

 People's choiceBest PresenterJudy Bailey, One Network News
John Campbell, TV3 News
Mike Hosking, Breakfast News
Maggie Barry, Maggie's Garden Show
Stacey Daniels, Mai Time
Peter Elliot, Captain's Log
Jason Fa'afoi, What Now
Mikey Havoc, Havoc Luxury Suites & Conference Facility
Kate Hawkesby, Breakfast
Carol Hirschfeld, 3 News
Paul Holmes, Holmes
Richard Long, One Network News
Peta Mathias, Taste NZ
Alison Mau, Home Front
Carolyn Robinson, 3 News

Best New Programme (people's choice)
Mitre 10 DIY Rescue, Julie Christie (Touchdown Television)
Mercy Peak, John Laing (South Pacific Pictures)
Travel.co.nz, Tash Christie (Screentime Communicado)
Babies (Imagination Television)
Being Eve (South Pacific Pictures)
Captain's Log (Livingstone Productions)
Havoc Luxury Suites & Conference Facility (TVNZ)
Mercury Lane (Greenstone Productions)
Mo Show (Level One)
The Panel (Screentime-Communicado)
Pioneer House (Touchdown Television)
Quest For Success (Jump Productions)
Spin Doctors (Comedia Pictures)
The Weakest Link (Touchdown Television)
Willy Nilly (Big House)

References

External links
KiwiTV – 2002 TV Guide NZ Television Awards

New Zealand television awards
Television awards
New Zealand
Awards
2000s in New Zealand cinema